FC Velké Meziříčí is a Czech football club located in Velké Meziříčí in the Vysočina Region. It currently plays in the Moravian–Silesian Football League, which is the third tier of Czech football.

Czech Cup
In the 2008–09 Czech Cup, Velké Meziříčí played a top-flight team for the first time in its 102-year history, being paired with SK Dynamo České Budějovice. They lost 0–4 in the second round.

References

External links
 Official website 
 Profile at idnes.cz 

Football clubs in the Czech Republic
Association football clubs established in 1906
Žďár nad Sázavou District
1906 establishments in Austria-Hungary